= 10 Lost Days =

2018 comic book series

10 Lost Days is an independent comic book series published by artist Sam Hart starting in 2018.

The story takes place during the ten-day period when Europe switched from the Julian calendar to the Gregorian calendar, following young astrologer Sophya Brahe, who has exactly these ten days to save humanity and magic in a world where humans and deities are frozen, with the mysterious exception of herself. The character also has the help of a small group of gods and mythological entities she has managed to gather.

All volumes of the series have been made possible through crowdfunding on the Catarse platform. The eighth and final volume was released in 2022.

In 2023, the series won the 35th HQ Mix Trophy in the category of Best Publication in Miniseries.
